2-Methylhexane (C7H16, also known as isoheptane, ethylisobutylmethane) is an isomer of heptane. It is structurally a hexane molecule with a methyl group attached to its second carbon atom. It exists in most commercially available heptane merchandises as an impurity but is usually not considered as impurity in terms of reactions since it has very similar physical and chemical properties when compared to n-heptane (straight-chained heptane).

Being an alkane, 2-methylhexane is insoluble in water, but is soluble in many organic solvents, such as alcohols and ether. However, 2-methylhexane is more commonly considered as a solvent itself. Therefore, even though it is present in many commercially available heptane products, it is not considered as a destructive impurity, as heptane is usually used as a solvent. Nevertheless, by concise processes of distillation and refining, it is possible to separate 2-methylhexane from n-heptane.

Within a group of isomers, those with more branches tend to ignite more easily and combust more completely. Therefore, 2-methylhexane has a lower Autoignition temperature and flash point when compared to heptane. Theoretically 2-methylhexane also burns with a less sooty flame, emitting higher-frequency radiation; however, as heptane and 2-methylhexane differ by only one carbon atom, in terms of branching, both burn with a bright yellow flame when ignited.

Compared to n-heptane, 2-methylhexane also has lower melting and boiling points.  A lower density of liquid is found in 2-Methylhexane than heptane.

On the NFPA 704 scale, 2-methylhexane is listed as a reactivity level-0 chemical, along with various other alkanes. In fact, most alkanes are unreactive except in extreme conditions, such as combustion or strong sunlight. At the presence of oxygen and flame, 2-methylhexane, like heptane, combusts mostly completely into water and carbon dioxide. With UV-light and mixed with halogens in solvents, usually bromine in 1,1,1-trichloroethane, a substitution reaction occurs.

See also
 3-Methylhexane

References

Alkanes